This is a list of electoral district results for the 1983 Queensland state election.

Results by electoral district

Albert

Archerfield

By-election 

 This by-election was caused by the death of Kevin Hooper. It was held on 9 March 1984.

Ashgrove

Aspley

Auburn

Balonne

Barambah

Barron River

Brisbane Central

Bulimba

Bundaberg

Burdekin

Burnett

Caboolture

Cairns

Callide

Carnarvon

Chatsworth

Condamine

Cook

Cooroora

Cunningham

Everton

Fassifern

Flinders

Greenslopes

Gregory

Gympie

Hinchinbrook

Ipswich

Ipswich West

Isis

Ithaca

Kurilpa

Landsborough

Lockyer

Lytton

Mackay

Mansfield

Maryborough

Merthyr

Mirani

Mount Coot-tha

Mount Gravatt

Mount Isa

Mourilyan

Mulgrave

Murrumba

Nudgee

Nundah

Peak Downs

Pine Rivers

Port Curtis

Redcliffe

Redlands

By-election 

 This by-election was caused by the death of John Goleby. It was held on 2 November 1985.

Rockhampton

By-election 

 This by-election was caused by the resignation of Keith Wright, who entered Federal politics. It was held on 16 February 1985.

Rockhampton North

Roma

Salisbury

Sandgate

Sherwood

Somerset

South Brisbane

South Coast

Southport

Stafford

By-election 

 This by-election was caused by the death of Denis Murphy. It was held on 4 August 1984.

Surfers Paradise

Toowong

Toowoomba North

Toowoomba South

Townsville

Townsville South

Townsville West

Warrego

Warwick

Wavell

Whitsunday

Windsor

Wolston

Woodridge

Wynnum

Yeronga

See also 

1983 Queensland state election
Members of the Queensland Legislative Assembly, 1983–1986

References 

Results of Queensland elections